The ninth elections for Cardiganshire County Council took place in March 1913. They were preceded by the 1910 election and followed by the 1919 election as no election took place in 1916 due to the First World War.

Overview of the result
As in previous elections, there was a Liberal majority.

Candidates

As in previous elections, there were a large number of unopposed returns. In all 31 members were returned without a contest.

Gains and losses

Very few seats changed hands.

Contested elections

It was stated that the bitterest fights were between candidates of the same political persuasion.

Retiring aldermen

Eight aldermen retired. These included one Conservartve, Sir Marteine Lloyd, and seven Liberals. Edward Evans, Lima Jones and Dr Jenkin Lewis sought re-election but were not subsequently re-appointed aldermen. Vaughan Davies MP, Evan Richards and Rev John Williams did not seek re-election but were re-appointed. Sir Marteine Lloyd and Thomas Morris retired from county politics

The New Council

|}

|}

|}

Results

Aberaeron

Aberbanc

Aberporth

Aberystwyth Division 1

Aberystwyth Division 2

Aberystwyth Division 3

Aberystwyth Division 4

Aeron

Borth

Bow Street

Cardigan North

Cardigan South

Cilcennin

Cwmrheidol

Devil's Bridge

Felinfach

Goginan

Lampeter Borough

Llanarth

Llanbadarn Fawr

Llanddewi Brefi

Llandygwydd

Llandysul North

Llandysul South

Llansysiliogogo

Llanfair Clydogau

Llanfarian

Llanfihangel y Creuddyn

Llangoedmor

Llangeitho

Llangrannog

Llanilar

Llanrhystyd

Llanllwchaiarn

Llansantffraed

Llanwnen

Llanwenog

Lledrod

Nantcwnlle

New Quay

Penbryn

Strata Florida

Taliesin

Talybont

Trefeurig

Tregaron

Troedyraur

Ysbyty Ystwyth

Election of aldermen
Eight aldermen were elected, including only one Conservative.

M. L. Vaughan Davies, Liberal (retiring alderman, from outside Council - did not seek election)
Evan Richards, Liberal (retiring alderman, from outside Council - did not seek election)
R.J.R. Loxdale, Liberal (elected councillor at Llanilar)
Major Price Lewes, Conservative (from outside the Council, retiring councillor at Cilcennin)
Rev John Williams (retiring alderman, from outside Council - did not seek election)
E.J. Davies, Liberal (elected councillor at New Quay)
Rev Daniel Evans, Liberal  (elected councillor at Troedyraur)
D. Lewis Jones, Liberal (elected councillor at Lledrod)

By-elections

Llanilar by-election
E.J. Evans, Cwncybarcud, who previously represented Llanrhystud from 1901 until 1904 was returned unopposed following the appointment of R.J.R. Loxdale as alderman.

Lledrod by-election
A Liberal candidate was returned unopposed for Lledrod following the appointment of Daniel L. Jones as alderman.

New Quay by-election
Following the appointment of E.J. Davies as alderman no valid nomination was initially received.

Troedyraur by-election

References

1913
1913 Welsh local elections
20th century in Ceredigion